Gerard A. Janssen (b. May 3, 1946) is a Dutch-born jeweller, watchmaker and former political figure in British Columbia. He represented Alberni in the Legislative Assembly of British Columbia from 1988 to 2001 as a New Democratic Party (NDP) member.

He was born in Venlo, the son of Nicholas Jannsen and Maria Sloesen, and came to Canada with his parents in 1952. Janssen later took over the operation of the business established by his parents in 1956. In 1967, he married Florence Edith Irene McIver. He was a member of the Alberni Valley Chamber of Commerce, also serving as its president. Janssen was first elected to the provincial assembly in a 1988 by-election held after Bob Skelly resigned his seat to enter federal politics. He served as government whip in the assembly. Janssen was a member of the provincial cabinet, serving as Minister of Small Business, Tourism and Culture from 2000 to 2001. He was defeated by Gillian Trumper when he ran for reelection to the assembly in the new riding of Alberni-Qualicum in 2001.

Electoral history

References 

1946 births
Living people
20th-century Canadian politicians
21st-century Canadian politicians
British Columbia New Democratic Party MLAs
Canadian jewellers
Dutch emigrants to Canada
Members of the Executive Council of British Columbia
Tourism ministers of British Columbia
People from Venlo